Bhavavarman II (Khmer: ព្រះបាទភវវរ្ម័នទី២ Thai: พระบาทภววรรมัมที่ ๒ ) of the Chenla Kingdom was King of the Khmer Empire from 639 to 657.

Biography 
King Bhavavarman II reigned shortly from 639 to 657 AD between Isanavarman I and Jayavarman I. He was of unknown origin, neither the son nor the approved successor to Isanavarman I. He was the successor to the throne from King Isanvarman I (Khmer: ឦសានវម៌្មទី១), but there is no evidence as to whether he was the son of Ishavarman I. Scholars speculate that he may have been one of the princes in the royal family or was one of the sons of Issavaraman I, which still has no consensus on this assumption. He made many inscriptions, but none of them mentioned his history.

When King Bhavavarman II died, King Jayavarman I, his son, succeeded to the throne. When King Jayavarman I died without a male heir, his granddaughter, Jayadevi, ascended to the throne. During this time, the Chenla was in full swing with political turmoil and her reign was disputed, leading to the division of the state of Upper Chenla and Lower Chenla.

References

Chenla
Khmer Empire
7th-century Cambodian monarchs